William C. Velasquez Jr. (May 9, 1944June 15, 1988) was an American social activist and vote organizer. He founded the Southwest Voter Registration Education Project which worked to expand Latino and Hispanic American interest and participation in the voting process. His group popularized the motto Su Voto Es Su Voz (Your Vote is your Voice).

Biography 
Velasquez was born to William and María Luisa (née Cardenas) Velásquez, who were Mexican Americans. His father was stationed in Florida during World War II where he worked as a union organizer. He attended St. Mary's University where in 1967, he helped form the Mexican American Youth Organization and later on earned a B.A. in economics. Velasquez helped form the basis for Raza Unida Party as El Movimiento Social de La Raza Unida.

In 1968, Velasquez was boycott coordinator for United Farm Workers and organized strikes at the Rio Grande Valley. He founded the Mexican American Unity Council and then later on became field director for the Southwest Council of La Raza in 1970.

From 1972 to 1974, Velasquez started work on the Southwest Voter Registration Education Project which would have helped Latinos be given more involvement with the voting process. Velasquez also hoped that the democratic process was more aware of the Latino vote.

Velasquez would not live long enough to see his accomplishments flourish. He died in 1988 due to kidney cancer.

Velasquez was survived by his wife Jane Velasquez, daughters Catarina and Carmen and son Guillermo.

In 1995, Velasquez was posthumously honored with the Presidential Medal of Freedom by President Bill Clinton.

References 

1944 births
1988 deaths
American trade unionists of Mexican descent
Deaths from kidney cancer
People from Orlando, Florida
People from San Antonio
Presidential Medal of Freedom recipients
Raza Unida Party
St. Mary's University, Texas alumni
United Farm Workers people